Budzma The Best Rock / Budzma The Best Rock/New is a two-disc compilation album by Belarusian rock bands. Both invited musicians and the winners of selection were put on the compilation. CDs were published by the public movement Budzma Belarusians! together with European Radio for Belarus in November 2009, and a few months later all of the FM-radio stations, regional and district Houses of Culture of Belarus received them. The compiler and mastering engineer is Slava Korań, the frontman of the ULIS band.

Track listing

Critical reception 

Alieh Michalievič, head of Radio "Stolitsa," in a letter to Budzma Belarusians! underlined “high-quality domestic-produced Belarusian compositions!” Chief director of Radio Belarus Naum Galperovich also thanked for the disk, material from which “certainly arouse interest.” Director of the radio channel "Culture" Kaciaryna Ahiejeva reported that she particularly liked the compilation album of Belarusian rock, while the music editors of her radio station recognized the excellent quality of recordings, so they gladly air the compositions on the network.

Several songs from the compilation were presented in the Tuzin.fm charts: “Jak Viecier” (WZ-Orkiestra, Zmicier Vajciuškievič) (“Megatour-2008”), “Znajdzi Mianie” (Esprit) (“Megatour-2009”), “Da Sinih Skałaŭ” (Esprit), “Ciańki” (Hair Peace Salon) (all “Megatour-2010”).

The song “Vyjście” by IQ48 was selected in the list of “100 Greatest Belarusian Songs” presented by Tuzin.fm in 2015.

Footnotes

References

External links 
 

2009 compilation albums
Compilation albums by Belarusian artists